John Wingate Thornton (August 12, 1818–June 6, 1878) was a United States lawyer, historian, antiquarian, book collector and author.

Biography

Early life
He was born August 12, 1818, at the home of his grandfather, Thomas Gilbert Thornton in Saco, Maine. He attended school at Thornton Academy in Saco, Maine.

Career
While studying to become a lawyer, he worked for his uncle, John Fairfield and graduated from Harvard in 1840 with an LL.B. He was awarded an honorary degree of A.M. from Bowdoin College in 1860.
He practiced law in Boston, Massachusetts. John Wingate Thornton researched and wrote numerous family genealogies and authored a number of books. In 1844 he was a founding member of the New England Historic Genealogical Society and authored numerous articles for their publication, the Register. He was a member and Vice-President of the American Statistical Association, and a member and Vice-President of the Prince Society. He was elected a member of the American Antiquarian Society in 1855.

His 1844 report to the American Statistical Association was presented to Congress by John Quincy Adams who notes that it demonstrates "a multitude of gross and important errors in the printed census of 1840."

In August 1607, a company of Englishmen were landed near the mouth of the Kennebec River in Maine with the intent of starting a colony known as the Popham Colony. However, half of the colony returned in December 1607 and the remaining members returned to England the following year. John Wingate Thornton was invited to deliver a speech on August 29, 1862, during an occasion set to commemorate the failed Popham Colony. Much to the chagrin of the audience and Fort Popham Celebration committee members, John Wingate Thornton correctly pointed out, in contradiction to the beliefs of those who invited him, that the Popham Colony was not the first attempt at New England colonization, and that additionally it was not a serious attempt at creating a permanent colony as only men and not entire families were sent. His unpopular speech was left out of the printed proceedings of the commemoration and John Wingate Thornton resorted to privately printing the text of his speech in 1863.

He died on June 6, 1878, at the Oak Hill family estate in Scarborough, Maine, and is buried in the Laurel Hill Cemetery in Saco, Maine. A short biography of his life was written by Thomas Coffin Amory.

Marriage and family
On May 31, 1848 he was married to Elizabeth Wallace Bowles by the Reverend Augustus C. Thompson in Roxbury, Massachusetts. They had four children, only one of whom (Elizabeth Thorndike Thornton) survived to adulthood.

Timeline

Published works
 Memorial Of The American Statistical Association Praying The Adoption Of Measures For The Correction Of Errors In The Census, 1844; OCLC 13848351
 Lives of Isaac Heath, and John Bowles, ... and of Rev. John Eliot jr, 1850; OCLC 3824853
 Memoir of the Gilbert Family, 1850; OCLC 13990800
 Mementos of the Swett Family, 1851; OCLC 16395396
 Landing at Cape Anne, 1854; OCLC 5382334
 Ancient Pemaquid, 1857; OCLC 23935503
 Peter Oliver's "Puritan Commonwealth" Reviewed, 1857; OCLC 10820661
 First Records of Anglo-American Colonization, 1859; OCLC 6414115
 Pulpit of the American Revolution, or, The political sermons of the period of 1776, 1860; OCLC 249633623
 Colonial Schemes of Popham and Gorges : Speech at the Fort Popham Celebration, August 29, 1862, 1863; OCLC 5362353
 Historical Relation of New England to the English Commonwealth, 1874; OCLC 950363

Institutional Resources

American Antiquarian Society, Worcester, Mass.
John Wingate Thornton Papers, 1850-1877. Mss. Dept. Misc. mss. Boxes "T". 1 Folder, 98 items.
Composed mainly of correspondence related to his publications and especially regarding his Popham Celebration speech.

Bowdoin College Library, Brunswick, Maine
Alumni Biographical File, John Wingate Thornton
George J. Mitchell Department of Special Collections and Archives.
Catalog Number 1.3.6. Box 1. Folder 54, John Wingate Thornton.

Boston Athenaeum, Boston, Mass.
John Wingate Thornton Papers
Book containing letters to children and family photographs.

Boston Public Library, Boston, Mass.
Rare Books and Manuscripts Dept.
19 July 1842	Letter from Elizabeth (Schuyler) Hamilton, New York, NY to JWT.            	*Ch.C.12.2
19 Apr 1844	Letter from Oliver Wendell Holmes (1809-1894) to JWT.                      	*Ch.B.10.74
11 Apr 1849	Letter from Frances M. Caulkins, New London, CT to JWT.                   	Ch.A.6.75
10 ??? 18x8	Letter from JWT to William Fogg, York, ME.                                 	Ch.B.11.8
08 Dec 1854	Letter from JWT to R. W. Griswold, Boston, MA.                             	Griswold Mss. No. 1081
09 Nov 1855	Letter from JWT to Mellen Chamberlain, Boston, MA.                         	Ch.J.2.117
Various	Letters (5) from JWT to Mellen Chamberlain, Boston, MA.                    	Ms.Am.1400 (1114)
16 Dec 1857	Letter from Samuel McPherson Janey (1801-1880) to JWT.                     	Ch.E.1.1
13 Mar 1858	Letter from George Edward Ellis (1814-1894), Charlestown, MA to JWT. 	Ch.J.1.98
22 Mar 1858	Letter from Joseph Willard (1798-1865), antiquarian, to JWT.                	Ch.J.3.23
21 Apr 1858	Letter from D. Foley(Rectory, Templetuoby, Ireland)  to JWT.               	Ch.B.5.80
1862	Papers relating to the acquisition by BPL of Gen. Burgoyne parole.         	Ms.1258
18 Oct 186x	Letter from William Willis (1794-1870), to JWT.                            	*Ch.J.7.112
1866	Mss and letters (2) from Edward Jarvis (1803-1884) to JWT.                 	Ms. 1337
24 Nov 1868	Letter from Timothy Farrar, Dorchester, Mt. Bowdoin to JWT.                	Ch.A.8.14
03 Dec 1874	Revere Beach and Lynn Railroad Co., Boston, MA (Mss notes by JWT).         	No. 1 in **H.30.446
01 Jul 1875	Letter from Charles Cotesworth Pinckney (1812-1898) to JWT	.              	Ch.J.2.72
01 Mar 1876	Letter from Benjamin Franklin DeCosta (1831-1904), New York, NY to JWT.    	Ch.J.6.7
Undated		Letter from H. Sowerby to JWT.                                             	Ch.E.4.65A

Dyer Library and Saco Museum, Saco, Maine
Thornton Family Papers
Dyer Library Archives & Special Collections
17 May 1859	Letter from Sarah Gookin Storer to John Wingate Thornton.	Dyer Library.

Houghton Library, Harvard College, Cambridge, Mass.
02 Oct 1848	Letter from John Wingate Thornton to George Livermore.       	Autograph File T.
23 Jul 1851	Letter from George Stillman Hillard to John Wingate Thornton.	Autograph File H.
26 Dec 1860	Letter from Jared Sparks to John Wingate Thornton.           	Autograph File S.
24 Jan 1866	Letter from John Wingate Thornton to Mary Cutts.             	Autograph File T.
11 Jan 1873	Letter from Charles William Eliot to John Wingate Thornton.  	Autograph File E.
16 Jan 1873	Letter from John Wingate Thornton to Charles William Eliot.  	Autograph File E.
19 Mar 1874	Letter from John Wingate Thornton to Samuel Batchelder.      	Batchelder Family Papers. Call No.: MS Am 1368; Item 195.
26 Oct 1875	Letter from John Wingate Thornton to Samuel Batchelder.      	Batchelder Family Papers. Call No.: MS Am 1368; Item 196.
15 Feb 1876	Letter from John Wingate Thornton to Capt. H. Hight.         	Autograph File T.
 
Maine Historical Society, Portland, Maine
Thornton, John Wingate, 1818-1878, Spec Coll. 1523
Contains note correspondence (1842-1877), pertaining to the Chipman, Crocker, Cutts, Ellis, Peperell, Scammon, Thaxter, Smith, and other families. Also contains biographical and genealogical material relating to Edward Godfrey, Habijah Savage, Joshua Scottow, Robert Jordan, and Captain Thomas Cammock. Lawyer, antiquarian, historian, author, and founder of New England Historical Genealogical Society. b. in Saco, Me.. resident of Boston.

Maine State Library and Archives, Augusta, Maine
John Wingate Thornton, Collected Papers, MS091 T513
Vol. 1  1658-1877, Vol. 2  1800-1814, Vol. 3  1815-1877

New England Historic And Genealogical Society, Boston, Mass.
John W. Thornton Papers, Mss 95, R. Stanton Avery Special Collections Department
NEHGS houses the premier collection of John Wingate Thornton papers.  They comprise approximately 2 linear feet of shelf space.  As NEHGS describes them, they contain "genealogical, historical, business and personal papers of the Thornton and 37 allied families of Saco, ME, and North Hampton, N.H. Items of interest include:
02 Jan 1838	Letter from John Fairfield to John Wingate Thornton.                    	Box 2; Folder 25.
22 May 1840	Letter from John Fairfield to John Wingate Thornton.                    	Box 2; Folder 25.
20 Jun 1842	Letter from John Wingate Gookin to John Wingate Thornton.               	Box 4; Folder 121.
24 Oct 1842	Letter from John Wingate Gookin to John Wingate Thornton.               	Box 4; Folder 121.
27 Dec 1842	Letter from John Wingate Gookin to John Wingate Thornton.               	Box 4; Folder 121.
02 Nov 1843	Letter from James Brown Thornton, Sr. to John Wingate Thornton.         	Box 2; Folder 39. 
08 Dec 1843	Letter from Harriette Gookin Storer to John Wingate Thornton.           	Box 4; Folder 128.
15 Dec 1843	Letter from John Fairfield to John Wingate Thornton.                    	Box 2; Folder 25.
24 Feb 1844	Letter from John Fairfield to John Wingate Thornton.                    	Box 2; Folder 25.
07 Apr 1844	Letter from Eliza Gookin Thornton to John Wingate Thornton.             	Box 2; Folder 40.
25 May 1844	Family memorial, signed by family members at a gathering in Saco, Maine.	     
07 Nov 1845	Letter from Albert Gookin Thornton to John Wingate Thornton.            	Box 2; Folder 38.
07 Nov 1845	Letter from Thomas Gilbert Thornton to John Wingate Thornton.           	Box 2; Folder 40.
22 Dec 1845	Letter from James Brown Thornton, Sr. to John Wingate Thornton.         	Box 2; Folder 39.
10 Jan 1846	Letter from James Brown Thornton, Sr. to John Wingate Thornton.         	Box 2; Folder 39.
02 Feb 1846	Letter from James Brown Thornton, Sr. to John Wingate Thornton.         	Box 2; Folder 39.
11 Jul 1846	Letter from James Brown Thornton, Sr. to John Wingate Thornton.         	Box 2; Folder 39.
18 Jul 1846	Letter from Rev. Henry Gookin Storer to John Wingate Thornton.          	Box 2; Folder 37.
22 Jun 1846	Letter from John Fairfield to John Wingate Thornton.                    	Box 2; Folder 25.
08 Dec 1846	Letter from John Wingate Gookin to John Wingate Thornton.               	Box 4; Folder 121.
30 Jan 1847	Letter from John Fairfield to John Wingate Thornton.                    	Box 2; Folder 25.
31 Mar 1847	Letter from John Fairfield to John Wingate Thornton.                    	Box 2; Folder 25.
11 Apr 1847	Letter from John Fairfield to John Wingate Thornton.                    	Box 2; Folder 25.
21 Apr 1847	Letter from John Fairfield to John Wingate Thornton.                    	Box 2; Folder 25.
25 Apr 1847	Letter from John Fairfield to John Wingate Thornton.                    	Box 2; Folder 25.
16 Jul 1847	Letter from John Wingate Thornton to Eliza Gookin Thornton.             	Box 2; Folder 40.
01 Feb 1848	Letter from Anna Paine Fairfield to John Wingate Thornton.              	Box 2; Folder 25.
24 Mar 1848	Letter from Rev. Henry Gookin Storer to John Wingate Thornton.          	Box 2; Folder 37.
30 Mar 1848	Letter from Anna Paine Fairfield to John Wingate Thornton.              	Box 2; Folder 25.
11 Apr 1848	Letter from Eliza Gookin Thornton to John Wingate Thornton.             	Box 2; Folder 38.
27 May 1848	Letter from Eliza Gookin Thornton to John Wingate Thornton.             	Box 2; Folder 40.
29 Jul 1848	Letter from Anna Paine Fairfield to John Wingate Thornton.              	Box 2; Folder 25.
03 Feb 1850	Letter from Eliza Gookin Thornton to John Wingate Thornton.             	Box 2; Folder 40.
23 Apr 1850	Letter from Charles Cutts Gookin Thornton to John Wingate Thornton.     	Box 2; Folder 38.
04 Jul 1850	Letter from Eliza Gookin Thornton to John Wingate Thornton.             	Box 2; Folder 40.
19 Jul 1850	Letter from Eliza Gookin Thornton to John Wingate Thornton.             	Box 2; Folder 40.
29 Oct 1850	Letter from Eliza Gookin Thornton to John Wingate Thornton.             	Box 2; Folder 40.
01 Nov 1850	Letter from Eliza Gookin Thornton to John Wingate Thornton.             	Box 2; Folder 40.
08 Nov 1850	Letter from Eliza Gookin Thornton to John Wingate Thornton.             	Box 2; Folder 40.
15 Feb 1851	Letter from Eliza Gookin Thornton to John Wingate Thornton.             	Box 2; Folder 40.
09 Sep 1851	Letter from James Brown Thornton, Sr. to John Wingate Thornton.         	Box 2; Folder 40.
09 Sep 1853	Letter from John Wingate Thornton to Elizabeth Bowles Thornton.         	Box 2; Folder 40.
07 Jul 1857	Letter from George Wingate Gookin to John Wingate Thornton.             	Box 4; Folder 118.
23 Jul 1857	Letter from George Wingate Gookin to John Wingate Thornton.             	Box 4; Folder 118.
26 Nov 1860	Letter from Sarah Gookin Storer to John Wingate Thornton.               	Box 4; Folder 118.
04 Jan 1861	Letter from Sarah Gookin Storer to John Wingate Thornton.               	Box 2; Folder 40.
Undated    	Letter from Sarah Gookin Storer to John Wingate Thornton.               	Box 5; Folder 155.
Undated    	Land Deed from John Wingate Thornton to Daniel Gookin.                  	Box 5; Folder 156.
Various    	John Wingate Thornton's personal family genealogy book.                 	Box 1
    
Social Law Library, Boston, Mass.
The Social Law Library holds a copy of a rare book (Wingate, Edmond. Maximes of Reason . 1658) that was previously owned by John Wingate Thornton.  In addition, in their Willard Photograph Collection, they have an original photograph of John Wingate Thornton.
Undated.	Photograph, John Wingate Thornton. Boston, Mass.	Willard Photograph Collection

University of Michigan, Ann Arbor, MI
Special Collections Library
09 Apr 1875	Letter from Wendell Phillips to John Wingate Thornton.               	Univ. of MI.

University of Virginia, Charlottesville, VA
Albert and Shirley Small Special Collections Library
07 Nov 1874	Letter from Frederick William Gookin to John Wingate Thornton.               	Univ. of VA.

See also
Thornton Academy

References

External links
The History of NEHGS

1818 births
1878 deaths
Harvard Law School alumni
American genealogists
American statisticians
People from Saco, Maine
People from Scarborough, Maine
19th-century American historians
19th-century American male writers
Burials in Maine
Members of the American Antiquarian Society
19th-century American lawyers
American male non-fiction writers